The Radio One Sessions (1996) is a CD by the Damned consisting of all their BBC sessions for Janice Long, Mike Read and Saturday Live with Richard Skinner - in other words all their Radio One sessions except the ones recorded for John Peel. In addition, there are two tracks which were recorded for Peel, the tracks "Liar" and "Hit Or Miss".

Their complete BBC Peel Sessions (apart from "Liar" and "Hit Or Miss") are on the disc Sessions of the Damned. (The complete Peel tracks would not fit onto an 80-minute CD so the two mentioned above were placed on the Radio One Sessions CD instead.)

Track listing
 John Peel Session, 22 October 1979
"Liar"

 Mike Read Session, 16 November 1979
"Plan 9 Channel 7" 
"I Just Can't Be Happy Today"  
"Noise Noise Noise" 
"Drinking About My Baby"

 John Peel Session, 6 October 1980
 "Hit Or Miss"

 Mike Read Session, 9 October 1980
 "Dr. Jekyll & Mr. Hyde"  
"Wait For The Blackout"  
"Lively Arts"
"History of the World Part 1"

 Saturday Live, 4 August 1984
 "Stranger On The Town" 
"Limit Club" 
"Smash It Up"

 Janice Long 14 April 1985
 "Shadow of Love"  
"Is It a Dream?"  
"Street of Dreams"  
"There'll Come a Day"

BBC Radio recordings
The Damned (band) live albums
1996 live albums
1996 compilation albums